Angelo Di Pietro (22 May 1828 – 5 December 1914) was a cardinal of the Catholic Church and prefect of the Congregation of the Council.

Biography
Angelo Di Pietro was born in Vivaro Romano, Tivoli. He was educated at the  Seminary of Tivoli, and La Sapienza University in Rome where he earned a doctorate utroque iuris in 1858. 
 
He was ordained on 20 December 1851 in Tivoli. He served as secretary and pro-vicar general of the Bishop of Tivoli; vicar general of the diocese of Ostia and Velletri. He was appointed as titular bishop of Nisa in Lycia and auxiliary bishop of Velletri on 25 June 1866. He was promoted to the titular see of Nazianzo on 28 December 1877. He was appointed as Apostolic delegate and extraordinary legate in Paraguay and Uruguay on 18 January 1878. He served as Nuncio to the Brazilian Empire from 1879 until he was posted as Nuncio to Bavaria on 21 March 1882, where he served until 1887, when he became Nuncio to Spain.

He was created Cardinal-Priest of Santi Bonifacio ed Alessio in the consistory of 16 January 1893 by Pope Leo XIII. Pope Leo appointed him Prefect of the Congregation of the Council on 20 June 1893. He opted for the title of San Lorenzo in Lucina on 22 June 1903. He participated in the conclave of 1903 that elected Pope Pius X and 1914 that elected Pope Benedict XV. He died in 1914.

References

20th-century Italian cardinals
Apostolic Nuncios to Argentina
Apostolic Nuncios to Bavaria
Apostolic Nuncios to Brazil
Apostolic Nuncios to Paraguay
Apostolic Nuncios to Uruguay
Apostolic Nuncios to Spain
1828 births
1914 deaths
Members of the Sacred Congregation of the Council
Cardinals created by Pope Leo XIII